Family Kuarta o Kahon (formerly Kuwarta o Kahon and The Pepe Pimentel Show) was a Philippine game show which ran from 1962 to 2000 and was aired on ABS-CBN, BBC and RPN. It holds the record for being the longest-running Philippine game show for 38 years.

Host

Main host
 Pepe Pimentel (1962–2000)

Co-hosts
 Amy Perez (1987–1988)
 Pinky Marquez
 Encar Benedicto
 Plinky Recto
 Monina Tan
 Marissa Sanchez
 Lito Pimentel
 Richard Reynoso
 Arnell Ignacio
 Michael Segovia
 Anthony Segovia
 Elvira Manahan
 Charo Santos
 Zsa Zsa Padilla

See also
List of programs broadcast by ABS-CBN
List of programs aired by Banahaw Broadcasting Corporation
List of programs previously broadcast by Radio Philippines Network
Eat Bulaga

References

1962 Philippine television series debuts
1972 Philippine television series endings
1973 Philippine television series debuts
2000 Philippine television series endings
ABS-CBN original programming
Banahaw Broadcasting Corporation original programming
Radio Philippines Network original programming
1960s Philippine television series
1970s Philippine television series
1980s Philippine television series
1990s Philippine television series
Philippine game shows
Filipino-language television shows